The Big Time (1958) is a short science fiction novel by American writer Fritz Leiber. Awarded the Hugo Award for Best Novelette during 1958, The Big Time was published originally in two parts in Galaxy Magazine'''s March and April 1958 issues, illustrated by Virgil Finlay. It was subsequently reprinted in book form several times. The Big Time is a story involving only a few characters, but with a vast, cosmic back story.

Plot
The storyline features members of one of two factions, both capable of time travel, engaged in a long-term conflict called "The Change War". Their method of battle involves changing the outcomes of events throughout history (temporal war). The two opposing groups are nicknamed the Spiders and the Snakes after their respective sponsors. The true forms or identities of the Spiders and the Snakes, how those nicknames were chosen, or whether they are in any way descriptive are all unknown.

The narrator of the novel is Greta, a young human female employed at a Recuperation Station where soldiers recover from battles. Greta is an Entertainer: part prostitute, part nurse, part psychotherapist. However, other characters narrate parts of the story in lengthy monologues about their experiences and opinions as they visit the spider-staffed facility.

New soldiers, entertainers, and medical staff are recruited by existing Change War participants from various places and times; characters include: Cretan Amazons, Roman legionnaires, eight-tentacled Lunans (natives of a civilization that thrived on Earth's Moon a billion years ago), Hussars, Wehrmacht Landsers, Venusian satyrs (recruited from Venus a billion years in the future), American GIs, and Space Commandos. Soldiers from the armies of Alexander the Great, Genghis Khan, Napoleon, and Stalin may find themselves fighting side-by-side or on opposing sides. Likewise, medical staff and entertainers are inducted into the temporal war to provide medical treatment, rest, and relaxation for injured and weary combatants.

Within the context of the story, the Universe as we know it runs on the Little Time. The Change War combatants and their facilities (places such as Field Hospitals, Express Rooms, Recuperation Stations, and Entertainment Spots), located within artificially-created bubbles of spacetime outside of the Universe, run on the Big Time. The Big Time is described metaphorically by the narrator as a train traveling through the Little Time's countryside. Combat operations occur when soldiers venture into a time and place in the Little Time on orders from their superiors.

Adding to the atmosphere of cynicism about the war's aims and causes is the revelation that one of its effects was to change history and cause an Axis victory in World War II. However devastating this development is to 20th century humanity, now doomed to live under the worldwide oppressive and genocidal rule of Nazi Germany, in the context of the overall Spider-Snake cosmic conflict, this change was incidental and of only marginal importance.

The first few chapters establish the backstory, setting, amazing futuristic technology and characters. The main plot of the novel involves the discovery of a time bomb in the Recuperation Station, and the attempts to defuse the bomb and identify the saboteur, essentially a locked room mystery within a science fiction context.

Reception
Algis Budrys praised The Big Time (which he categorized as a play, not a novel) as evidence that Leiber was the only science fiction writer of his generation "who as a matter of course and conviction saw through the mores and circumstances which are now proving nonviable not only in commercial literature but in what we can call life as well", and a precursor to Roger Zelazny and Samuel R. Delany. In February 1968 he named the book the "Best Thing All Year". In 2012, it was selected for inclusion in the Library of America's two-volume compilation American Science Fiction: Nine Classic Novels of the 1950s.

Influences
Leiber's short story "Try and Change the Past", also from 1958, is set in the same universe. It features a New York man just recruited by the Snakes going AWOL and trying to change his own past, in which he was murdered by his wife, finding out that the universe resists all his efforts and is "conserving reality", and finally not having any choice but to go back to fight in the Time War.

Poul Anderson develops the same basic theme of a time war between two powerful factions, who confront each other throughout time and use people of past periods as their soldiers, in the novel The Corridors of Time (1965).

"The Big Time" was the primary influence for Misha Kolesoski's album Dreams of Spiders and Snakes (2016).

References

 External links 

 
  (Digital transcription of serialized version)
 
 Page scans of The Big Time as serialized in Galaxy Science Fiction'' in 1958, parts one and two, at the Internet Archive
 

1958 American novels
1958 science fiction novels
American science fiction novels
Hugo Award for Best Novel-winning works
Alternate Nazi Germany novels
Novels about time travel
Novels by Fritz Leiber
Novels first published in serial form
Works originally published in Galaxy Science Fiction
Ace Books books
Temporal war fiction
Novels republished in the Library of America